Sirajul Islam Sarder is a Bangladesh Nationalist Party politician. He is a former Jatiya Sangsad member representing the Pabna-4 constituency elected in 1991 and February 1996.

References 

Living people
People from Pabna District
Bangladesh Nationalist Party politicians
5th Jatiya Sangsad members
6th Jatiya Sangsad members
Year of birth missing (living people)